The 1998 Skol World Darts Championship was held between 29 December 1997 and 4 January 1998 at the Circus Tavern in Purfleet, Essex. Skol, who sponsored the inaugural event in 1994 returned as title sponsors – which they were to fulfil for the next five years.

Following an out-of-court settlement (Tomlin Order) on 30 June 1997, the World Darts Council (WDC) agreed to change its name to the Professional Darts Corporation (PDC) and the tournament was thus the PDC World Darts Championship.

John Part, who won the first Embassy/BDO World Championship after the 1992–93 "split" had joined the PDC but failed to qualify beyond the group stage. Peter Manley had emerged as a rising talent in the PDC and was seeded 7th for the championship. He lost a close quarter-final to eventual finalist, Dennis Priestley. Priestley lost his third successive final to Phil Taylor – this defeat being the most convincing 6 sets to 0. Rod Harrington was the only player who managed to take any sets from the Power during his 2–5 semi-final defeat. This was the last year the PDC used the group stage in the championship. 

Phil Taylor became the most successful player in World Championship history – winning his 6th title (4 in the PDC and 2 in the BDO), eclipsing Eric Bristow who won five titles during the 1980s. It was also Taylor's fourth title in a row.

Seeds
 Phil Taylor
 Dennis Priestley
 Alan Warriner
 Peter Evison
 Rod Harrington
 Keith Deller
 Peter Manley
 Bob Anderson

Prize money
The prize fund was £72,500.

Results

Group stage

Group A

29 December–1 January

Group B

29 December–1 January

Group C

29 December–1 January

Group D

29 December–1 January

Group E

29 December–1 January

Group F

29 December–1 January

Group G

29 December–1 January

Group H

29 December–1 January

Knockout stages

Third-place play-off:  (5) Rod Harrington 90.00 4 – 1  (6) Keith Deller 81.69

Representation from different countries
This table shows the number of players by country in the World Championship. Four countries were represented in the World Championship, no more than in the previous championship.

References

PDC World Darts Championships
PDC World Darts Championship
PDC World Darts Championship 1998
PDC World Darts Championship
PDC World Darts Championship
PDC World Darts Championship
Purfleet
Sport in Essex